Don Chee Way and Steuart station is a light rail station in San Francisco, California, United States, serving the San Francisco Municipal Railway's F Market & Wharves heritage railway line. It is located on Don Chee Way, a streetcar right-of-way, between Steuart Street and The Embarcadero and serves as the station for the San Francisco Railway Museum.

The station opened on March 4, 2000 with the streetcar's extension to Fisherman's Wharf.

Don Chee Way was named after Donald Chee, a San Francisco Municipal Railway project manager who was responsible for getting the F Market & Wharves line built. Chee died of cancer on August 26, 2002.

References

External links 

San Francisco Railway Museum
SFMTA – Don Chee Way & Steuart St inbound, outbound
SFBay Transit (unofficial): Don Chee Way/Steuart St

San Francisco Municipal Railway streetcar stations
Railway stations in the United States opened in 2000